Sedasa was a town of ancient Isauria, inhabited in Roman times. The name does not occur among ancient authors but is inferred from epigraphic and other evidence.

Its site is located near Namze Yaylası, Asiatic Turkey.

References

Populated places in ancient Isauria
Former populated places in Turkey
Roman towns and cities in Turkey
History of Konya Province